Emil Ferris (born 1962) is an American writer, cartoonist, and designer. Ferris debuted in publishing with her 2017 graphic novel My Favorite Thing Is Monsters.  The novel tells a coming-of-age story of Karen Reyes, a girl growing in 1960s Chicago, and is written and drawn in the form of the character's notebook.  The graphic novel was praised as a "masterpiece" and one of the best comics by a new author.

Early life
Emil Ferris was born to Eleanor Spiess-Ferris and Mike Ferris on Chicago's South Side and grew up on North Side's Uptown. Her parents are artists who met at the School of the Art Institute of Chicago. Ferris traces her Hispanic lineage from Indigenous Mexico to Spain, and is also of Lebanese,  German, French, Irish emigres, and Sephardic Jewish descent.

Career
Ferris worked as a freelance illustrator and toy designer for clients such as McDonald's and Takara Tomy before being an author. Ferris identified early in her life as a lesbian but later on came to see herself as bisexual. Ferris was sexually abused as a child, which she says negatively affected her ability to draw in a cartoon style for many years.

In 2001, when she was 40, Ferris contracted West Nile fever from a mosquito bite. Three weeks after going to the hospital, she was paralyzed from the waist down and lost movement in her right hand. She eventually regained motor functionality and  returned to working and drawing, receiving a MFA in creative writing from the School of the Art Institute of Chicago.

While recovering from the paralysis, Ferris worked on her graphic novel. My Favorite Thing Is Monsters tells the story of Karen Reyes, a 10-year-old girl and fan of monster movies (like Ferris herself) who, growing up amidst the social tensions of 1960s Chicago, investigates the death of her upstairs neighbor. The book is written and drawn in the form of Reyes' diary notebook, with crosshatched artwork drawn with a ballpoint pen.

My Favorite Thing is Monsters was to be released in 2016, but the Chinese company shipping the books went bankrupt and the entire run was held at the Panama Canal. The 400-page book was eventually released in 2017 by Fantagraphics, receiving praise from authors like Art Spiegelman, Alison Bechdel, and Chris Ware; it was regarded as one of the best comics of 2017.

In April 2022, Ferris was reported among the more than three dozen comics creators who contributed to Operation USA's benefit anthology book, Comics for Ukraine: Sunflower Seeds, a project spearheaded by editor Scott Dunbier, whose profits would be donated to relief efforts for Ukrainian refugees resulting from the February 2022 Russian invasion of Ukraine.

Awards
 2017 Ignatz Award for Outstanding Graphic Novel for My Favorite Thing Is Monsters
 2017 Ignatz Award for Outstanding Artist
 2018 Lambda Literary Award for LGBTQ Graphic Novel for My Favorite Thing Is Monsters
 2018 Lynd Ward Prize for best graphic novel of the year for My Favorite Thing Is Monsters
 2018 Eisner Award for Best Writer/Artist
2019 Grand prix de la critique ACBD
2019 Fauve d'or at FIBD 2019
2019 - Premi a la millor obra estrangera (Best Foreign Work) at the 37th Edition of Saló del Còmic de Barcelona for My Favorite Thing Is Monsters.

References

External links
 
 Radio interview with Emil Ferris on Fresh Air (43 minutes, 2017)

American female comics artists
School of the Art Institute of Chicago alumni
American comics writers
Female comics writers
Ignatz Award winners for Outstanding Artist
1961 births
Living people
American people of Lebanese descent
Lambda Literary Award winners
Eisner Award winners for Best Writer/Artist
LGBT people from Illinois
LGBT comics creators
Eisner Award winners for Best Coloring
American bisexual writers